Yevgeni Aleksandrovich Smirnov (born 4 January 1986) is a former Russian professional football player. He also holds Belarusian citizenship.

External links
 
 

1986 births
People from Vologda
Living people
Russian footballers
Association football defenders
FC SKVICH Minsk players
FC Tekstilshchik Ivanovo players
FC Spartak-UGP Anapa players
FC Khimik-Arsenal players
FC Darida Minsk Raion players
FC Iskra-Stal players
Belarusian Premier League players
Moldovan Super Liga players
Russian expatriate footballers
Expatriate footballers in Belarus
Expatriate footballers in Moldova
Footballers from Vologda